Oberflachs is a former municipality in the district of Brugg in Canton Aargau in Switzerland.  It is located about 6 km south west of the town of Brugg.  On 1 January 2014 the former municipalities of Oberflachs and Schinznach-Dorf merged into the new municipality of Schinznach.

History

While various Roman era bricks and coins have been discovered, the first record of Oberflachs is in 1342 as Obreflaht.  From the Middle Ages until 1732, Kasteln Castle held the rights to low justice in the village.  The rights to administer High Justice was held by the bailiwick of Schenkenberg and was acquired in 1460 by the city of Bern.  In 1732 the village came fully under Bern's authority when Bern bought the Kasteln Castle.  By 1607 the village is identified as a partly independent municipality.

Oberflachs was, like the whole Schenkenbergertal in the 18th century, a very poor municipality.  Grain and vineyard cultivation were the major economic sources in the 17th century.  However, in 1850 wine production collapsed because of vine diseases and phylloxera.  The poverty and collapse of the wine industry forced many residents (particularly in the 1880s) to emigrate overseas.  The wine recovered, so that in 1990 there were 22 hectares cultivated.

In the 1970s several new housing districts were built.  In 1960, the number of commuters exceeded the number of locals that worked in the municipality.  In 2005, agriculture provided 28% of the jobs in the community.  A merger of Oberflachs with four municipalities failed in 2009 because Veltheim voters rejected the proposal.

Geography

Of this area,  or 54.4% is used for agricultural purposes, while  or 37.6% is forested. Of the rest of the land,  or 8.9% is settled (buildings or roads).

Of the built up area, housing and buildings made up 5.9% and transportation infrastructure made up 2.4%.  34.6% of the total land area is heavily forested and 3.0% is covered with orchards or small clusters of trees.  Of the agricultural land, 18.0% is used for growing crops and 25.7% is pastures, while 10.7% is used for orchards or vine crops.

The former municipality is located in the Brugg district, at the foot of the Schenkenbergertal. It consists of the linear village of Oberflachs and Kasteln Castle.

Coat of arms
The blazon of the municipal coat of arms is Argent three Flax flowers Azure seeded Or slipped and leaved Vert in saltire and in pale.  This is an example of canting with the German word for flax being Flachs.

Demographics
Oberflachs had a population (as of 2011) of 498.  , 4.2% of the population are foreign nationals.  Over the last 10 years (1997–2007) the population has changed at a rate of 10.7%.  Most of the population speaks German (98.3%), with English being second most common ( 1.1%) and Italian being third ( 0.4%).

The age distribution, in Oberflachs is; 56 children or 11.7% of the population are between 0 and 9 years old and 70 teenagers or 14.6% are between 10 and 19.  Of the adult population, 39 people or 8.1% of the population are between 20 and 29 years old.  62 people or 12.9% are between 30 and 39, 78 people or 16.3% are between 40 and 49, and 63 people or 13.1% are between 50 and 59.  The senior population distribution is 59 people or 12.3% of the population are between 60 and 69 years old, 35 people or 7.3% are between 70 and 79, there are 13 people or 2.7% who are between 80 and 89,and there are 5 people or 1.0% who are 90 and older.

 there were 113 single family homes (or 53.6% of the total) out of a total of 211 homes and apartments.  There were a total of 0 empty apartments.  , the construction rate of new housing units was 4.1 new units per 1000 residents.

In the 2007 federal election the most popular party was the SVP which received 45.1% of the vote.  The next three most popular parties were the FDP (12.1%), the Green Party (11.5%) and the SP (9.9%).

In Oberflachs about 80% of the population (between age 25–64) have completed either non-mandatory upper secondary education or additional higher education (either university or a Fachhochschule).  Of the school age population, there are 48 students attending primary school in the municipality.

The historical population is given in the following table:

Sights
The village of Oberflachs is designated as part of the Inventory of Swiss Heritage Sites.

Economy
, Oberflachs had an unemployment rate of 1.3%.  , there were 37 people employed in the primary economic sector and about 12 businesses involved in this sector.  22 people are employed in the secondary sector and there are 4 businesses in this sector.  74 people are employed in the tertiary sector, with 10 businesses in this sector.

 there was a total of 226 workers who lived in the municipality.  Of these, 175 or about 77.4% of the residents worked outside Oberflachs while 49 people commuted into the municipality for work.  There were a total of 100 jobs (of at least 6 hours per week) in the municipality.  Of the working population, 5.1% used public transportation to get to work, and 55.1% used a private car.

Religion
Of the rest of the population, there was 1 individual who belonged to the Christian Catholic faith.

References

External links
 Official Website of Oberflachs

Former municipalities of Aargau